The North West Province Australian Football League is an Australian rules football competition in South Africa operating out of the North West Province.

Clubs
Christiana
Ventersdorp
Ganyesa SCORE community
Bodibe
Verdwaal
Rustenburg
Mafikeng
Vryberg
Itsoseng
Ramatlabama

See also

AFL South Africa
Australian rules football in South Africa
List of Australian rules football leagues outside Australia

References

External links

Australian rules football in South Africa
Sport in North West (South African province)